Jaanus Raidal (born 19 September 1963 Tartu) is an Estonian politician. He was a member of VII Riigikogu. From 1989 until 1993, he was the mayor of Otepää.

References

Living people
1963 births
Estonian Greens politicians
People's Union of Estonia politicians
Estonian Centre Party politicians
Members of the Riigikogu, 1992–1995
Mayors of places in Estonia
Tallinn University of Technology alumni
Politicians from Tartu